The Women's 50 metre backstroke competition of the 2022 FINA World Swimming Championships (25 m) was held on 15 and 16 December 2022.

Records
Prior to the competition, the existing world and championship records were as follows.

The following new records were set during this competition:

Results

Heats
The heats was started on 15 December at 11:05.

Semifinals
The semifinals was started on 15 December at 19:48.

Final
The final was held on 16 December at 20:06.

References

Women's 50 metre backstroke
2022 in women's swimming